Ho Chi Minh City Open University is a public university located in District 3, Ho Chi Minh City, Vietnam. This is the first open university in Vietnam. The university was initially Ho Chi Minh City Open and Semi-Private University established on June 15, 1990, then it obtained the present name on June 26, 2006.

HCMCOU is a higher education institution offering a variety of programs ranging from on-site to distance learning and learning at satellite academic centers, it aims to meet various learning needs of society and to contribute enriching the country's human resources.

There are currently more than 60,000 students enrolling in daytime, nighttime, and distance-learning courses at HCMCOU. The university has, thus far, granted approximately 40,000 bachelor's degrees and more than 1,500 master's degrees.

Faculties 
 Faculty of Business Administration
 Faculty of Economics & Law
 Faculty of Finance – Banking
 Faculty of Accounting – Auditing
 Faculty of Biotechnology
 Faculty of Civil & Electrical Engineering
 Faculty of Computer Science
 Faculty of Foreign Languages
 Faculty of Sociology – Social Work – Southeast Asian Studies

Education investments
Every year the Open University of Ho Chi Minh spent an average of 10% to 15% of funds to equip laboratories, library investment. Current system of university laboratories meets the requirements of the experimental practice of students training program.

The university has also focused on the work of serving students. Library held more than 500 seats, with computer intranet and internet to help students look up the documents. Library now has a Web-based management software, process automation system to borrow books and return. In the library is 40,000 copies (English and Vietnamese) in different curricula, reference books, journals and dissertations of undergraduate and graduate students ...

International cooperation
- The university is maintaining and developing partnerships, exchange information with other organizations and universities to seek foreign collaboration capabilities that link the university training, postgraduate, short courses and vocational training. The work of international cooperation has started with a positive trend and there are many good progress.

- Vietnam Belgium Master Program, Université Libre de cooperation with Brussels, Belgium. Conducted from 1995 to now, MBA training. Since 2001, open training MSc Management and Economics from the State in 2004 to open more training programs Master of Business Administration - Information Systems.

- The cooperation program compiling textbooks, trained social workers, school social studies, social work practice and scholarship support for students of Sociology.

- The program is conducted regularly every year since 1993, is assessed annually and create credibility for the scientific study on women with other international organizations Raddda Barnen (Sweden), Ford Foundation, World Vision International, Church World Service (USA), University of Oxford (UK).

- Recommended Programs Teachers Volunteer Organization Youth Educational Services (U.S.) conducted continuously since 1994. Teachers are teaching enthusiastic reviews, good. The volunteer teachers are then engaged to teach the other Faculty.

- Student Exchange Program with Kyungnam University (Korea). Cooperative program between the two schools was carried out on many areas such as student exchanges, support teacher training and exchange of lecturers.

- Schools also received much help from the Japanese non-governmental organizations to help prevent audio-visual equipment, helping British Council learning materials ... universities in the world has as much support for enhanced Capilano College training programs under the credit system, construction of distance education programs, help train teachers write curriculum for distance learning.

- The international conference program and invited foreign lecturers for the training of school teachers.

- The university officials to participate in study abroad such as Canada, Thailand, USA and UK ... Many faculty members from foreign universities through the visiting teaching and research at the University.

- E-learning program of cooperation with United Kingdom.

Universities in Ho Chi Minh City